Cláudia Maria das Neves (born 17 February 1975 in Guarujá, São Paulo) is a Brazilian women's basketball player. Internationally, Claudinha has competed in two Summer Olympics: 2000 and 2008 Summer games with the Brazil women's national basketball team. At the 2000 games, Claudinha won a bronze medal. She has also competed for Brazil in other international competitions, including the 2002 FIBA World Championship for Women. Professionally, the Brazilian played in the WNBA in the United States from 1999-2002; the first three with the Detroit Shock and her final season with the Miami Sol.

References

1975 births
Living people
People from Guarujá
Brazilian women's basketball players
Olympic basketball players of Brazil
Olympic bronze medalists for Brazil
Basketball players at the 2000 Summer Olympics
Basketball players at the 2008 Summer Olympics
Detroit Shock players
Miami Sol players
Olympic medalists in basketball
Undrafted Women's National Basketball Association players
Brazilian expatriate basketball people in France
Medalists at the 2000 Summer Olympics
Brazilian expatriate basketball people in the United States
Sportspeople from São Paulo (state)